Lü Wei (born June 21, 1983 in Beijing) is a 5’11" (1.82 m) female Chinese softball player (pitcher) who competed at the 2004 Summer Olympics, the 2006 world championship, the 2006 World Cup of Softball and the 2008 Summer Olympics.

Lü started competing in 1998. She joined the national team in 2002. Lü came off elbow surgery in March 2007, operation and recovery which took place in Cincinnati where Lü was flown by team China.

In the 2004 Olympic softball competition she finished fourth with the Chinese team. She played seven matches as pitcher.

External links
profile 2004
profile 2008
alternate profile 2008
profile 2006

1983 births
Living people
Chinese softball players
Olympic softball players of China
Sportspeople from Beijing
Softball players at the 2004 Summer Olympics
Softball players at the 2008 Summer Olympics
Asian Games medalists in softball
Softball players at the 2010 Asian Games
Softball players at the 2006 Asian Games
Asian Games silver medalists for China
Asian Games bronze medalists for China
Medalists at the 2006 Asian Games
Medalists at the 2010 Asian Games